Johnny Halford (October 15, 1930 – October 11, 2013) was an American stock car racing driver. He competed in the NASCAR Winston Cup Series between 1969 and 1978.

Career
Halford began his racing career at the age of 19, but by the time he began his NASCAR career in 1969 he was considered "old", at age 38. Halford's average starting position would be 24th while he would finish 21st on average. An attempt to qualify for the 1972 Miller High Life 500 would end up in failure. After the end of his career, Halford had earned $27,129 in total race earnings ($ when adjusted for inflation).

In the 1981 ARCA 200 at Daytona International Speedway, Halford was involved in an eleven-car accident that left him with a neck injury.

References

1930 births
2013 deaths
Sportspeople from Spartanburg, South Carolina
Racing drivers from South Carolina
NASCAR drivers
ARCA Menards Series drivers